L. Kevin Kelly is currently the Chief Executive of Halo Privacy, a cyber security organization that focuses on digital security for high profile individuals and Fortune 500 companies.

Early life and career
Kevin is currently the Chief Executive of Halo Privacy, a leading Cyber security organization that focuses on Digital Security Solutions for high profile individuals and Fortune 500 companies. Halo Privacy ensures 100% privacy protection of client communications, propriety information and sensitive data.

Kevin was raised in Virginia and received a Bachelor of Science from George Mason University and an MBA from Duke University. He proudly served on the Board of Advisors for the Fuqua School of Business from 2006-2018. Kevin has lived and worked all over the world, including Tokyo, London, New York and Chicago.

Kevin began what would become his pivotal role in leadership consultancy at the executive search firm, Heidrick & Struggles International. Kelly joined the Heidrick & Struggles' Tokyo office in 1997.  He later served as regional managing partner of Asia Pacific and then Europe, the Middle East, and Africa from 2001 to 2006.  He became Chief Executive Officer in 2006. As CEO of Heidrick & Struggles, Kevin transformed an extremely successful executive search company into a modern global leadership-consulting firm, operating in 60 countries.  

Kevin’s expertise played a pivotal role in defining the new terms of engagement between technology and talent. He helped create joint ventures between  NASDAQ and the Economist Intelligence Unit.  He also collaborated with the World Economic Forum’s Young Global Leaders program, contributing to the development of contemporary leaders. He was frequently featured as a guest on media and news outlets, including, but not limited to, The Financial Times, The Wall Street Journal, CNN and CNBC.

After Heidrick & Struggles, Kevin became the President and CEO of Asia Pulp and Paper NA. Through this role, Kevin deepened his understanding of doing business in China and across South East Asia. By building trusted relationships and advocating for high standards of transparency, Kevin was able to maintain the integrity of the business’s supply chains and introduce world class sustainability standards.

Throughout his career, he has focused on the challenges of leadership and has authored four books on the subject: “CEO-The Low Down on the Top Job” (2008); “Top Jobs – How They are Different and What You Need to Succeed” (2009); “Leading in Turbulent Times” (2010) and “Paragraph 3” (2022).

As CEO of Halo Privacy, Kevin has transitioned to a privacy activist. His work ensures that corporations, individuals and our military remain safe in an increasingly more threatening digital landscape.  He also continues his leadership consultancy with both Fortune 500 companies and various trade groups to ensure that the fostering of talented individuals continues to evolve in this ever-changing global marketplace.

References

Fuqua School of Business alumni
George Mason University alumni
Living people
American chief executives
Year of birth missing (living people)